Jacob O. Adler (1913–1999) was the professor of economics and business at the University of Hawaii and noted author of the 1966 book, Claus Spreckels: The Sugar King in Hawaii.

Born in Illinois but residing in Honolulu, Hawaii up until his death, Adler was survived by his wife Thelma and hānai (adopted) son Tony Sitachitta. He was inurned at the National Memorial Cemetery of the Pacific, Punchbowl.

Adler's Sugar King book is used as a source in Jon M. Van Dyke's Who Owns The Crown Lands of Hawai'i?;

References
 Honolulu Star-Bulletin Obituary, 1999
 Van Dyke, Jon M. Who Owns The Crown Lands of Hawai'i? 2008 University of Hawai'i Press 

1913 births
1999 deaths
Writers from Illinois
Writers from Honolulu
University of Hawaiʻi faculty
20th-century American biographers
Burials in the National Memorial Cemetery of the Pacific